The Rona is a right tributary of the river Iza in Romania. It discharges into the Iza in Sighetu Marmației.

References

Rivers of Romania
Rivers of Maramureș County